N1-Methyl-2-pyridone-5-carboxamide (also known as 1-methyl-6-oxopyridine-3-carboxamide or nudifloramide and abbreviated as 2PY, 2-Py or NMPC) is one of a number of metabolic products of nicotinamide adenine dinucleotide (NAD) degradation. The presence of 2PY in human blood serum can be an indication of poor kidney performance or chronic kidney disease. 2PY has been identified as a product of the metabolism of caffeine and niacin.

2PY's molecular formula is C7H8N2O2 and its molecular weight 152.153 g/mol.

References

2-Pyridones